The cardinal electors in the 1963 papal conclave numbered 82, of whom 80 participated. This papal conclave met from 19 to 21 June 1963. This list is arranged by region and within each alphabetically.

Cardinal József Mindszenty refused to leave the U.S. Legation in Budapest where he had lived since 1956 unless the Hungarian government met his demands for religious freedom in Hungary. Cardinal Carlos María de la Torre of Quito, Ecuador, was 89 years old and could not make the journey because he had suffered a stroke the previous December and was bedridden with thrombosis.

Roman Curia
National origin is noted for a member of the Roman Curia who is not Italian.
Gregorio Pietro Agagianian, Prefect of Propagation of the Faith (origin: Soviet Union)
Joaquín Albareda y Ramoneda, OSB, Librarian Emeritus of Vatican Library (origin: Spain)
Benedetto Aloisi Masella, Camerlengo, Prefect of Discipline of the Sacraments
Augustin Bea, SJ, President of Promoting Christian Unity (origin: Germany)
Francesco Bracci, Secretary Emeritus of Discipline of the Sacraments
Fernando Cento, Major Penitentiary of Apostolic Penitentiary
Carlo Chiarlo, Nuncio Emeritus of Brazil
Amleto Giovanni Cicognani, Secretary of State, Prefect of Extraordinary Ecclesiastical Affairs
Pietro Ciriaci, Prefect of Council
Carlo Confalonieri, Secretary of Consistorial
Santiago Copello, Chancellor of Apostolic Chancery (origin: Argentina)
Giuseppe Ferretto, Secretary of College of Cardinals
Paolo Giobbe, Datary of His Holiness
William Heard, Dean of the Roman Rota (origin: Scotland)
Alberto di Jorio, President of Vatican City State
André-Damien-Ferdinand Jullien, PSS, Dean Emeritus of Roman Rota (origin: France)
Arcadio Larraona Saralegui, Prefect of Rites (origin: Spain)
Paolo Marella, Prefect of St. Peter's Basilica
Francesco Morano, Secretary of Apostolic Signatura
Alfredo Ottaviani, Secretary of the Holy Office
Giuseppe Pizzardo, Prefect of Seminaries and Universities
Francesco Roberti, Prefect of Apostolic Signatura
Gustavo Testa, Prefect of Oriental Churches
Eugène-Gabriel-Gervais-Laurent Tisserant, Dean of the College of Cardinals, Prefect of Ceremonies, Librarian of Vatican Library, Archivist of Vatican Secret Archives (origin: France)
Luigi Traglia, Pro-Vicar General of Rome
Valerio Valeri, Prefect of Religious

Europe

Italy
Ildebrando Antoniutti, Nuncio to Spain
Antonio Bacci, Titular Archbishop of Colonia in Cappadocia
Alfonso Castaldo, Archbishop of Naples
Efrem Forni, Nuncio emeritus to Belgium and Luxembourg
Maurilio Fossati, OSsCGN, Archbishop of Turin
Giacomo Lercaro, Archbishop of Bologna
Clemente Micara, Vice Dean of College of Cardinals, Vicar General of Rome
Giovanni Battista Montini, Archbishop of Milan (was elected Pope and chose the name Paul VI)
Ernesto Ruffini, Archbishop of Palermo
Giuseppe Siri, Archbishop of Genoa
Giovanni Urbani, Patriarch of Venice

France
Maurice Feltin, Archbishop of Paris
Pierre-Marie Gerlier, Archbishop of Lyon
Joseph-Charles Lefèbvre, Archbishop of Bourges
Achille Liénart, Bishop of Lille
Paul Marie André Richaud, Archbishop of Bordeaux
Clément-Emile Roques, Archbishop of Rennes

Spain
Benjamín de Arriba y Castro, Archbishop of Tarragona
José Bueno y Monreal, Archbishop of Seville
Enrique Pla y Deniel, Archbishop of Toledo
Fernando Quiroga y Palacios, Archbishop of Santiago de Compostela

Germany
Julius Döpfner, Archbishop of Munich und Freising
Josef Frings, Archbishop of Cologne

Portugal
José da Costa Nunes, Archbishop Emeritus of Archdiocese of Goa e Damão
Manuel Gonçalves Cerejeira, Patriarch of Lisbon

Austria
Franz König, Archbishop of Vienna

Belgium
Leo Joseph Suenens, Archbishop of Brussels-Mechelen

Netherlands
Bernardus Johannes Alfrink, Archbishop of Utrecht

Hungary
József Mindszenty, Archbishop of Esztergom (absent)

Ireland
Michael Browne, OP, Superior General of the Order of Friars Preachers

Poland
Stefan Wyszyński, Archbishop of Warsaw and Gniezno

North America

United States
Richard Cushing, Archbishop of Boston
James McIntyre, Archbishop of Los Angeles
Albert Gregory Meyer, Archbishop of Chicago
Joseph Ritter, Archbishop of St. Louis
Francis Spellman, Archbishop of New York

Canada
Paul-Émile Léger, PSS, Archbishop of Montreal
James McGuigan, Archbishop of Toronto

Mexico
José Garibi y Rivera, Archbishop of Guadalajara

South America

Brazil
Jaime de Barros Câmara, Archbishop of São Sebastião do Rio de Janeiro
Augusto da Silva, Archbishop of São Salvador da Bahia
Carlos Carmelo Vasconcellos Motta, Archbishop of São Paulo

Argentina
Antonio Caggiano, Archbishop of Buenos Aires

Chile
Raúl Silva Henríquez, Archbishop of Santiago

Colombia
Luis Concha Córdoba, Archbishop of Bogotá

Ecuador
Carlos María de la Torre, Archbishop of Quito (absent)

Peru
Juan Landázuri Ricketts, OFM, Archbishop of Lima

Venezuela
José Quintero Parra, Archbishop of Caracas

Uruguay
Antonio María Barbieri, OFM Cap, Archbishop of Montevideo

Asia

China
Thomas Tien Ken-sin, SVD, Archbishop of Beijing

India
Valerian Gracias, Archbishop of Bombay

Japan
Peter Doi, Archbishop of Tokyo

Philippines
Rufino Jiao Santos, Archbishop of Manila

Syria
Ignatius Gabriel I Tappuni, Patriarch of Antioch of the Syrians (Cardinal Tappuni was born in Mosul, located in modern-day Iraq)

Africa

Tanganyika
Laurean Rugambwa, Bishop of Bukoba

Oceania

Australia
Norman Gilroy, Archbishop of Sydney

References

Additional sources 

1963 elections 
1963 elections in Europe
Pope John XXIII
Pope Paul VI
1958